was an  of the Imperial Japanese Navy. The second and last ship of this class to be built, she was completed in 1911. After mostly serving as a coastal patrol boat during World War I, she was converted to a minesweeper on June 1, 1930, along with her sister ship, . On April 1, 1936 she was scrapped after 25 years of service.

Background 
The Umikaze-class destroyers were designed after the Russo-Japanese War, as the Imperial Japanese Navy realized that the vessels in its current fleet of destroyers were too small and poorly designed for extended "blue water" operation.

Design and construction 

The Umikaze-class ships were based largely on the Royal Navy  destroyers . In terms of displacement, each vessel was almost three times larger than the previous destroyers in the Japanese Navy.

Displacement was  normal and  full load.

Armament was increased over the previous classes, with a pair of QF 4.7 inch Gun Mk I - IV guns, with one gun mounted on a small shelter forward and another on the quarterdeck and five QF 3 inch 12 pounder guns; One gun was mounted on each broadside at the break of the forecastle and the remaining guns were mounted on the centerline. The number of torpedoes was initially three in unreloadable tubes; but this was quickly changed to two in reloadable tubes in operational service.

After some delays due to her turbines not being delivered until March 1910, Yamkaze was launched on January 21, 1911 and commissioned on 21 October 1911.

Service history 
During World War I, Yamakaze mostly served as a coastal patrol boat and did not participate in any battle. In September 1914 Yamakaze, along with sister ship  and the armored cruisers Kurama, Tsukuba and Asama set out from Yokosuka to search for the German East Asia Squadron commanded by Vice Admiral Maximilian von Spee in the South Sea Islands. After the German cruiser  was sunk in the Battle of Cocos by the Australian cruiser , the Japanese forces in the South Pacific and Indian Ocean were reorganised into two squadrons to search for von Spee's ships, with Yamakaze joining the Second Southern Squadron, based at Truk. On June 1, 1930, she was converted to a minesweeper and renamed W-8. Yamakaze was scrapped on April 1, 1936.

References

Bibliography

Umikaze-class destroyers
1911 ships
Ships built by Mitsubishi Heavy Industries